Daphnella axis, common name the axle pleuratoma, is a species of sea snail, a marine gastropod mollusk in the family Raphitomidae.

Description
(Original description) The shell is straightly acuminate and contracted at the upper part. The whorls show two keels round the upper part. They are transversely faintly ridged beneath. The aperture is oblong. The sinus, which is formed between the two keels, is unusually deep. The color of the shell is whitish, somewhat indistinctly stained with orange-brown.

Distribution
This marine species occurs off the Philippines, in the Gulf of Oman and in the Gulf of Carpentaria - Queensland, Australia

References

  Brazier, J. 1876. A list of the Pleurotomidae collected during the Chevert expedition, with the description of the new species. Proceedings of the Linnean Society of New South Wales 1: 151–162
 Powell, A.W.B. 1966. The molluscan families Speightiidae and Turridae, an evaluation of the valid taxa, both Recent and fossil, with list of characteristic species. Bulletin of the Auckland Institute and Museum. Auckland, New Zealand 5: 1–184, pls 1–23 
 Boettger, O. 1895. Die marinen Mollusken der Philippinen. IV. Die Pleurotomiden. Nachrichtsblatt der Deutschen Malakozooligischen Gesellschaft 27(1-2, 3-4): 1-20, 41-63
 Melvill, J.C. & Standen, R. 1901. The Mollusca of the Persian Gulf, Gulf of Oman, and the Arabian Sea, as evidenced mainly through the collections of Mr. F.W. Townsend, 1893-1900; with descriptions of new species. Proceedings of the Zoological Society of London 1901(ii): 327-460 pls xxi-xxiv
 Hedley, C. 1922. A revision of the Australian Turridae. Records of the Australian Museum 13(6): 213–359, pls 42–56
 Cogger, H.G., in Cogger, H.G., Cameron, E.E. & Cogger, H.M. 1983, "Amphibia and Reptilia", Ed. Walton, D.W. (ed.), Zoological Catalogue of Australia, vol. 1, pp. 313 pp., Australian Government Publishing Service, Canberra

External links
 

axis
Gastropods described in 1846